The 1919 Baylor Bears football team was an American football team that represented Baylor University as a member of the Southwest Conference (SWC) during the 1919 college football season. In its sixth season under head coach Charles Mosley, the team compiled a 5–3–1 record and was outscored by a total of 92 to 19.

Schedule

References

Baylor
Baylor Bears football seasons
Baylor Bears football